Miloš Holaň (born April 22, 1971) is a retired Czech professional ice hockey player and currently the head coach of HC Poruba of the 1st Czech Republic Hockey League, the second tier in the Czech Republic. He played 49 games in the National Hockey League between 1993 and 1996 with the Philadelphia Flyers and Mighty Ducks of Anaheim, as well as several seasons in the Czechoslovak and Czech Extraliga. Internationally Holaň played for the Czechoslovakian national junior team at two World Junior Championships, and with the Czech Republic at two World Championships. After retiring in 2000 he turned to coaching, and has worked for multiple teams across Europe.

Playing career
Holaň was drafted 77th overall by the Philadelphia Flyers in the 1993 NHL Entry Draft. Along with the Flyers he played in the National Hockey League for the Mighty Ducks of Anaheim and in total played 49 regular season games, scoring 5 goals and 11 assists for 16 points and collecting 42 penalty minutes.

Career statistics

Regular season and playoffs

International

External links
 

1971 births
Czech ice hockey coaches
Czech ice hockey defencemen
EHC Freiburg players
HC Oceláři Třinec players
HC Vítkovice players
Hershey Bears players
Living people
Mighty Ducks of Anaheim players
People from Bílovec
Philadelphia Flyers draft picks
Philadelphia Flyers players
Sportspeople from the Moravian-Silesian Region
Czech expatriate ice hockey players in the United States
Czech expatriate ice hockey players in Germany
Czechoslovak ice hockey defencemen